Endogamy is the practice of marrying within a specific social group, religious denomination, caste, or ethnic group, rejecting those from others as unsuitable for marriage or other close personal relationships.

Endogamy is common in many cultures and ethnic groups. Several religious and ethnic religious groups are traditionally more endogamous, although sometimes with the added dimension of requiring marital religious conversion. This permits an exogamous marriage, as the convert, by accepting the partner's religion, becomes accepted within the endogamous rules. Endogamy, as distinct from consanguinity, may result in transmission of genetic disorders, the so-called founder effect, within the relatively closed community.

Adherence

Endogamy can encourage sectarianism and serves as a form of self-segregation. For instance, a community resists integration or completely merging with the surrounding population. Minorities can use it to stay ethnically homogeneous over a long time as distinct communities within societies that have other practices and beliefs.

The isolationist practices of endogamy may lead to a group's extinction, as genetic diseases may develop that can affect an increasing percentage of the population. However, this disease effect would tend to be small unless there is a high degree of close inbreeding, or if the endogamous population becomes very small in size.

Social dynamics
The Urapmin, a small tribe in Papua New Guinea, practice strict endogamy. The Urapmin also have a system of kinship classes known as tanum miit. Since the classes are inherited cognatically, most Urapmin belong to all of the major classes, creating great fluidity and doing little to differentiate individuals.

The small community on the South Atlantic island of Tristan da Cunha are, because of their geographical isolation, an almost endogamic society. There are instances of health problems attributed to endogamy on the island, including glaucoma and asthma as research by the University of Toronto has demonstrated.

Genealogy
Endogamic marriage patterns may increase the frequency of various levels of cousin marriage in a population, and may cause high probability of children of first, second, third cousins, etcetera.

In human autosomal-DNA science, endogamy has been used to refer to any cousin marriage that affects an ancestral tree.

If a cousin marriage has accrued in a known ancestral tree of a person, in historical time, it is referred to as pedigree collapse. This may cause relations along multiple paths between a persons autosomal-DNA matches. It creates stronger DNA matches between the DNA matches than expected from the nearest path.

Cousin marriage should not be confused with double cousins, which do not cause a pedigree collapse. Certain levels of sibling marriage and cousin marriage is prevented by law in some countries, and referred to as consanguinity.

A long term pattern of endogamy in a region may increase the risk of repeated cousin marriage during a long period of time, referred to as inbreeding. It may cause additional noise in the DNA autosomal data, giving the impressions that DNA matches with roots in that region are more closely related than they are.

Examples
Examples of ethnic and religious groups that have typically practiced endogamy include:
Alawites
 The Amish of North America.
Various Arab tribes
 Assyrians, indigenous Christian people of upper Mesopotamia.
 Armenians have a history of endogamy due to being almost entirely surrounded by Islamic neighbours while being a strongly Christian nation. 
Coptic Christians
 Daylamites, an ethnic group living south of the Caspian Sea in ancient and medieval Persia.
 Druze 
 Gitanos typically practice endogamy within their raza, or patrigroup.
 Greek Cypriots usually practice endogamy in order to maintain their status as the majority ethnic group on the island of Cyprus.
 Iranian Turkmens
 Judaism traditionally mandates religious endogamy, requiring that both marriage partners be Jewish, while allowing for marriage to converts. Orthodox Judaism maintains the traditional requirement for endogamy in Judaism as a binding, inherent part of Judaism's religious beliefs and traditions.
 The Knanaya, an endogamous group within the St. Thomas Christian Community of India. The community claims to have arrived to India in the fourth century and have been noted for their historical practice of endogamy.
 Members of the Church of Jesus Christ of Latter-day Saints or other religious and/or cultural groups relating to Mormonism
Syrian Christians of Kerala, India - but Marital conversion is allowed.
 Parsis.
 Rajputs
 The Vaqueiros de alzada of Spain.
 Yazidis
 Mandaeans
 Most Hindu jatis on the Indian subcontinent, as well as many endogamous baradaris among South Asian Muslims

See also
 Anti-miscegenation laws
 Arranged marriage
 Assortative mating
 Consanguinity
 Ethnic nationalism
 Ethnoreligious group
 Genealogical DNA test
 Interfaith marriage
 Jāti
 Miscegenation

Cousin marriage:
 Cousin marriage
 Marriages and gotras
 List of coupled cousins

Marriage systems:
 Exogamy
 Homogamy
 Hypergamy

References

External links

 

 
Caste
Incest